Allan Edwin George Elsom (18 July 1925 – 25 September 2010) was a New Zealand rugby union player. A three-quarter, Elsom represented Canterbury at a provincial level, and was a member of the New Zealand national side, the All Blacks, from 1952 to 1955. He played 22 matches for the All Blacks including six internationals.

References

1925 births
2010 deaths
Rugby union players from Christchurch
People educated at Christchurch Boys' High School
Canterbury rugby union players
New Zealand rugby union players
New Zealand international rugby union players
Rugby union wings
Dalzell-Whitelock family
Rugby union centres